Angeliki Stogia is a British Labour Party politician, councillor for Whalley Range in the City of Manchester who was Executive Member for Environment, Planning and Transport, with a leading role in the Manchester Climate Change Partnership.

She was first elected to Manchester City Council in 2012 taking the seat from the Liberal Democrats with a swing of over 36 per cent gaining a majority of 1,758.  She was re-elected in 2016, 2018 and 2019.  She was a Labour candidate for the North West England constituency in the 2014 European Parliament election in the United Kingdom.

She came to pursue a BSc degree in European Studies and Languages at Manchester Metropolitan University in 1995 from Arta, Greece. She worked with for the Network for Europe with the voluntary sector in the North West. She is the first ever Manchester councillor of Greek heritage.

She has been prominent in debates about transport policy in Manchester during changes precipitated by the COVID-19 pandemic in England, proclaiming "We hope that pedestrians and cyclists will reclaim the streets of this city". The decision to pedestrianise a stretch of Deansgate in May 2020 was attacked by Diamond Bus North West who claimed that the temporary traffic order was made to further the widely publicised long-term objective of Manchester City Council to close Deansgate to traffic permanently.  Stogia denied that the decision to settle the company's application for judicial review implied an admission of unlawfulness, but rather "an unwillingness to risk further public money on the inherently uncertain outcome of a court hearing contesting the legal challenge which they brought when other bus companies were willing to accept the temporary closure."  Consultations on permanent closure are continuing. Stogia stressed the need to resolve the issue of how buses could be re-routed when the road was first sealed off for four days during the Extinction Rebellion protest in 2019.

Angeliki is involved in the implementation of a number of high profile projects to improve Manchester’s travel infrastructure, including improvement works on the Manchester Salford Inner Relief route  in a bid to reduce congestion and decrease journey times on the ring road around Manchester and Salford city centres; works to tackle a notorious pinch point on the A57 (Hyde Road) and address a long-existing congestion issue in the Gorton area;  works to introduce new crossing facilities, trees, wider pavements, and parallel cycle lanes on Great Ancoats Street;  and works to transform the A57 Princess Road / Mancunian Way Junction, one of Manchester’s most dangerous junctions, by improving traffic flow and creating safer facilities for pedestrians and cyclists. 

She is involved in the decision to plant thousands of new trees across Manchester in the Tree Action Mcr scheme, which she says is "a visible demonstration of our deep-rooted commitment to greening the city and Manchester becoming zero carbon by 2038."

She leads on delivering Manchester’s “ambition and absolute determination to create a new network of high-quality, safe cycling routes” across Manchester. Schemes she is involved with that are being delivered include the Chorlton cycleway, the active Neighbourhood in Levenshulme, the upgraded junction at Mancunian Way/Princess Road, Rochdale Canal, and the Piccadilly to Victoria route. 

She was criticised because of the City Council's decision not to apply for funding of Pop-Up Bike Lanes in June 2020 when neighbouring authorities in Oldham, Stockport, Tameside and Trafford were setting them up on radial routes into Manchester.  She defended the council's position saying "The evidence points to the need for neighbourhood improvements, rather than pop up temporary cones for commuter cyclists down major routes which take capacity from public transport and don’t form part of an integrated transport network." She says pop-up cycle lanes are ‘not a magic bullet’ for encouraging safer ways of travelling because they offer little to pedestrians or cyclists making short journeys, standing firm in her belief that a long-term, sustainable modal shift to bikes is best supported through investment in creating safe, durable cycling infrastructure that stands the test of time.

References

Living people
21st-century British politicians
Politicians from Manchester
Labour Party (UK) councillors
Councillors in Manchester
People from Arta, Greece
Greek emigrants to the United Kingdom
Year of birth missing (living people)
Women councillors in England